George Tetteh Odonkor (born 26 May 1935) is an economist, lecturer and politician of the Republic of Ghana. He was a member of the first parliament of the second Republic of Ghana, he represented  Yilo-Osudoku Constituency under the membership of National Alliance of Liberals.

Early life and education 
Odonkor was born on 26 May 1935 in the Eastern Region of Ghana. He is an alumnus of Wimbledon Technical College in London which he attended in his early days. He further went to City of London College where he obtained his Bachelor of Science degree in economics to continue his academic pursuit. He is also an alumnus of the University of London and University of Reading where he obtained his Post-Graduate Diploma and Master of Science degree in agricultural economy Respectively.

Political career 
Odonkor contested the 1969 Ghanaian Parliamentary elections under the membership of National Alliance of Liberals to represent Yilo-Osudoku Constituency in the first Parliament of the second Republic of Ghana. He was sworn in as member of the Parliament on 1 October 1969 after emerging as the winner in the preceding election. His tenure ended and he left office on 13 January 1972 after the Parliament was dissolved.

Personal life 
He is Methodist Christian.

See also 
 List of MPs elected in the 1969 Ghanaian Parliamentary Elections

References 

1935 births
Living people
Ghanaian MPs 1969–1972